Badiyeh may refer to:

Badiyeh 1
Badiyeh 2
Badiyeh 3